Brian Watson (born 1971) is an American entrepreneur and political activist.

Brian Watson may also refer to:

Brian Watson (billiards player) in 2011 World Billiards Championship
Brian Watson (writer), see Science Fiction & Fantasy Translation Awards
Brian Watson, musician in Soulpreacher

See also
Bryan Watson (disambiguation)